The 2003 Intercontinental Cup was the 42nd Intercontinental Cup, an annual association football match contested by the winners of the previous season's UEFA Champions League and Copa Libertadores competitions. The match was played on 14 December 2003 between Boca Juniors of Argentina, winners of the 2003 Copa Libertadores and Milan of Italy, winners of the 2002–03 UEFA Champions League. The match was played at the neutral venue of the International Stadium Yokohama in Yokohama, in front of 70,000 fans. Matías Donnet was named as man of the match.

Since the 2004 final (a year later) was goalless after the extra 30 minutes and the game was settled by a penalty shoot-out, Matías Donnet scored the last goal of the Intercontinental Cup before being abolished to the FIFA Club World Cup.

Venue

Match details

See also
Intercontinental Cup
2002–03 UEFA Champions League
2003 Copa Libertadores
FIFA Club World Cup
2007 FIFA Club World Cup Final – contested between same teams
A.C. Milan in European football

References

External links
FIFA Article

Intercontinental Cup
Intercontinental Cup
Intercontinental Cup
2003
Intercontinental Cup 2003
Intercontinental Cup 2003
Intercontinental Cup 2003
Intercontinental Cup (football) matches hosted by Japan
Sports competitions in Yokohama
December 2003 sports events in Asia
2000s in Yokohama
2003 in association football